The 2022 Tennessee Lottery 250 was the fifteenth stock car race of the 2022 NASCAR Xfinity Series and the 13th iteration of the event. The race was held on Saturday, June 25, 2022, in Gladeville, Tennessee at Nashville Superspeedway, a  permanent D-shaped racetrack. The race took it's scheduled 188 laps to complete. Justin Allgaier, driving for JR Motorsports, put on a dominating performance, winning both stages, and leading 134 laps for his 18th career Xfinity Series win, along with his second of the season. To fill out the podium, Trevor Bayne, driving for Joe Gibbs Racing, and Riley Herbst, driving for Stewart-Haas Racing, would finish 2nd and 3rd, respectively.

Background 
The track was built in 2001 and is currently hosting the Ally 400, a NASCAR Cup Series regular season event, the Tennessee Lottery 250, and the Rackley Roofing 200.

It is a concrete oval track 1 miles (2.145 km) long. Nashville Superspeedway is owned by Speedway Motorsports, which acquired the track's previous owner Dover Motorsports in December 2021. Nashville Superspeedway is the longest concrete oval in NASCAR. Current permanent seating capacity is approximately 25,000, but will reach up to 38,000 for the NASCAR Cup Series event in 2021. Additional portable seats are brought in for some events, and seating capacity can be expanded to 150,000. Infrastructure is in place to expand the facility to include a short track, drag strip, and road course.

Entry list 

 (R) denotes rookie driver.
 (i) denotes driver who is ineligible for series driver points.

Practice 
The only 50-minute practice session was held on Friday, June 24, at 4:35 PM CST.

Qualifying 
Qualifying was held on Saturday, June 25, at 11:30 AM CST. Since Nashville Superspeedway is an oval track, the qualifying system used is a single-car, one-lap system with only one round. Whoever sets the fastest time in the round wins the pole.

Race results 
Stage 1 Laps: 45

Stage 2 Laps: 50

Stage 3 Laps: 93

Standings after the race 

Drivers' Championship standings

Note: Only the first 12 positions are included for the driver standings.

References 

2022 NASCAR Xfinity Series
NASCAR races at Nashville Superspeedway
Tennessee Lottery 250
2022 in sports in Tennessee